The Tibet Himalaya Mountaineering Guide School (also known as Lhasa Himalaya Mountaineering Guide School and Tibet Mountaineering School) is a mountaineering school, located in Lhasa, Tibet Autonomous Region, China.

History 
The school was founded in 1999 by Nyima Tsering, a three-time Mount Everest climber. Graduates of this school have led more than 180 mountain climbers from around the world to the top of Everest.

See also 

 China Tibet Mountaineering Association

References 

Mountaineering in China
Climbing organizations
Tibet
Mountaineering training institutes